Sacramento Valley National Cemetery is a  United States National Cemetery located about  southwest of Dixon, Solano County, California. The cemetary is intersected by the Union Pacific Railroad in the southeast of the cemetary. Opened for burials in 2006 with an initial  development, the Department of Veterans Affairs intends this site to serve needs for the next 50 years. The cemetary is the seventh national cemetary built in the state, and the 124th national cemetary built in the U.S.

History 
The 9 parcels of land that would eventually make up the cemetary were used as farmland from 1860 to 2004. In 2004, the land was purchased by the National Cemetary Administration and in 2006 the cemetary opened for burials, with the site being officially dedicated on April 22, 2007.

Notable interments

 Sonny Barger (1938–2022) – Hells Angels leader
 Marty Feldman (1922–2015) – Head Coach of the Oakland Raiders, World War II US Marine who fought in Guadalcanal, inducted into the Stanford Athletic Hall of Fame
 Earsell Mackbee (1941–2009) – US Air Force airman and professional football player
 Jimmy McCracklin (1921–2012) – Pianist, vocalist, and songwriter
 Chuck Tatum (1926–2014) – World War II veteran, Bronze Star Medal recipient, race car driver and builder
 George Winslow (1946–2015) – Child actor of the 1950s known for his stentorian voice and deadpan demeanor

References

External links
 Sacramento Valley National Cemetery at cem.va.gov
 
 

Protected areas of Solano County, California
Cemeteries in California
United States national cemeteries
Tourist attractions in Solano County, California
2006 establishments in California